Tom Birdseye (born July 13, 1951) is an American children's author. He is best known for writing books such as Attack of the Mutant Underwear, Just Call Me Stupid, and Tarantula Shoes. He signs his name with an eye at the end.

Bibliography
 Attack of the Mutant Underwear
 I'm Going To Be Famous 
 Tucker
 Just Call Me Stupid 
 Tarantula Shoes
 The Eye of the Stone
 Oh Yeah!
 Look Out Jack! The Giant Is Back
 Air Mail to the Moon
 A Regular Flood Of Mishap
 A Song of Stars
 Soap! Soap! Don't Forget The Soap
 She'll Be Comin' Round the Mountain
 Storm Mountain
 Waiting For Baby
 A Kids' Guide To Building Forts
 What I Believe: Kids Talk About Faith
 Under Our Skin: Kids Talk About Race

References

External links
 Official web site
 

Griswold, Jennifer. (2007-11-21). "Real-life inspiration. Author makes literature fun" (pages 1 and 2). The Oklahoman. Archived from the original (pages 1 and 2) on 2020-03-24. Retrieved 2020-03-24. – via Newspapers.com.

Keating, Kevin. (1995-03-31). "Teacher returns as author. Former instructor enthralls students with his own tales" (pages 1 and 2). The Spokesman-Review. Archived from the original (pages 1 and 2) on 2020-03-24. Retrieved 2020-03-24. – via Newspapers.com.

American children's writers
Living people
1951 births